James Cardinal McGuigan Catholic High School (JCMCHS, James Cardinal McGuigan, or shortly McGuigan) is a  secondary school in  Toronto, Ontario, Canada. It is named after James Charles McGuigan, a Canadian Cardinal of the Roman Catholic Church and the Archbishop of Toronto from 1934 to 1971. The school was founded by the order of the Franciscan Fathers, who recognized the need for a Catholic School in the Keele-Finch Community. It serves the Downsview neighbourhood of North York.

History
The school was opened in September 1982 by the Franciscans and the Metropolitan Separate School Board with the building constructed in 1984. The school expanded in 1988, when the MSSB acquired six acres west of the school from the North York Board of Education in exchange of the long-term lease of Lewis S. Beattie Secondary School to house students from École Charbonnel.

Since the closure of nearby Regina Pacis Catholic Secondary School in 2002, McGuigan's enrollment grew and its facilities were expanded with the new western wing built in 2006.

Background
Academics

James Cardinal McGuigan C.S.S. offers both an Applied (College) and Academic (University) bound courses, to which students can choose from. It also has an "Essentials" option as an alternative. The School offers a "High School Transition Program", where Grade 8 students follow and study based on a secondary school timetable for the month of July. This enables the students to get accustomed with secondary school rules, be able to engage with other students, and prepare them for the upcoming school year. This program is mainly run by leadership and council students who are closely selected based on academic and inter-personal skills. Upon beginning the first year, Grade 9 students go at an overnight three day excursion at the YMCA Camp Wanakita, to experience outdoor activities and encourage student interactions.

S.H.S.M. (Specialist High Skills Major)

The school offers a Transportation Technology course, where students take part in practical work and study theories in relation to automotive systems. Starting at Grade 11, students can select the Transportation Tech. S.H.S.M. program, which extends into Grade 12. The program has a co-op component where students are sent to auto companies, or car dealerships. The second and third S.H.S.M. programs that are offered include the Arts and Culture and Health and Wellness Programs. Upon completion, S.H.S.M. students will earn a red seal certification in their O.S.S.D. and become qualified for the workplace. Furthermore, the acquired practical experience and gained knowledge will give S.H.S.M. students an advantage in Post-Secondary education.

S.T.E.A.M. (Enriched Science, Technology, Engineering, Arts, and Math)

Recently, a specialty program called S.T.E.A.M. has been introduced in the school system and is similar to the MST (Enriched Math, Science, Technology) program offered by other schools. The specialty program has two components, the first is the S.T.E.A.M. S.H.S.M. program, which focuses on the existing S.H.S.M. courses already offered, but introducing it to first and second year students. Once a specialty course is selected, the students are offered dual-credit opportunities, introduction to OYAP programs, and guaranteed co-op placements. The second component of the S.T.E.A.M. program is the Academic Enriched route, in which students take mandatory honours math and science courses, and an elective in Computer Engineering, Robotics, and Transportation or Hospitality. In either routes, students must take an entry test and go through an interview process to be considered. Successful candidates are granted a placement in the program and S.T.E.A.M. students must maintain a 75% overall average to stay in the program.

A.C.E. (Advanced Credit Experience)

James Cardinal McGuigan C.S.S. is one of several schools in the city to have a partnership with nearby York University, making it the only school in the Catholic board to offer the A.C.E (Advanced Credit Experience) Program. Select Grade 12 students are able to take a post-secondary course from the choices offered without any enrolment fees. Completion of a post-secondary course will guarantee a course credit equivalent towards the student's university transcript, a consideration when applying to York University, a bursary from $1000-$5000, and a summer job placement. Furthermore, because of the partnership, the university is able to offer various scholarships to graduating students, one of them being the Honderich Bursary of $32,000 to either one or two students, and a Chancellor Bennett Entrance Award of $20,000. The school also offers a multitude of scholarship and bursary awards from different institutions to select students who meet the extensive and competitive qualifications.

Curriculum

James Cardinal McGuigan C.S.S. operates on a semester based schedule, with a maximum of 8 courses per school year, 4 per semester. Since the school is a Roman Catholic school, it follows a mandatory religious curriculum, where all students take compulsory Religion classes. In addition, there is a mandatory Religion Retreat school trip students go to every year as it counts as a percentage towards their average. The Grade 9 religion course is an open course focusing on the life of Jesus Christ. The Grade 10 religion course focuses more in depth of the Bible, looking into the Old Testament. The Grade 11 religion course revolves around World Religions. Students study eastern religions such as Buddhism, Hinduism, and Sikhism, and Western Religions such as Christianity, Islam, and Judaism. The Grade 12 religion course offers a University/College option which focuses on the philosophical nature of moral and ethics, combing it with the Roman Catholic perspective of life.

List of high schools in Ontario

Campus
The McGuigan campus is a combination of the recently constructed West Wing building and the original East Wing building. The difference between the two can be seen by the contrasting design and architecture.

Due to the growing student population and the need for better facilities, the new extension was built to modernize and revitalize the school. When the extension was finished, the new extension was able to add eight additional classrooms, additional multi-purpose rooms, a larger and more spacious administrative office, and a large, high ceiling cafeteria which can be converted to an equipped auditorium for events, and an outdoor yard for activities. Recently, the gym underwent an extensive renovation which added a new digital score board, addition of a fitness room, and among other upgrades.

The original building houses most of the school's 30+ classrooms, and the automotive shop, which is open to the school community. It also houses the St. Francis and St. Clare of Assisi Chapel, which retains numerous historical stained glasses.

Athletics
James Cardinal McGuigan offers a multitude of sport teams to join from, in addition, there are sports clubs that are offered for after-school recreational purposes.

Sports
 Football
 Basketball
 Soccer
 Volleyball
 Ultimate Frisbee
 Baseball
 Tennis
 Badminton
 Golf
 Cross Country
 Track and Field
 Shot put
Discus Throw
Javelin Throw

See also
List of high schools in Ontario

References

External links

James Cardinal McGuigan Catholic High School

Toronto Catholic District School Board
High schools in Toronto
Catholic secondary schools in Ontario
Educational institutions established in 1982
Franciscan high schools
1982 establishments in Ontario
North York